Saurasish Sukanta Lahiri (born 9 September 1981) is an Indian former first-class cricketer who played for Bengal. In June 2016 he announced his retirement from all forms of cricket.

References

External links
 

1981 births
Living people
Indian cricketers
Bengal cricketers
India Green cricketers
East Zone cricketers
Kolkata Knight Riders cricketers
People from Howrah